Bird Watching is a  novelty jazz album by Don Elliott and Granville Alexander "Sascha" Burland, recording as The Nutty Squirrels.

Cannonball Adderley plays alto sax on the song "Yardbird Suite".

Track listing

Side one
"Bird Watching" – 2:41
"Flamingo" – 2:22
"Cool Canary" – 2:34
"Sparrow in the Treetop" – 2:09
"When the Red, Red Robin (Comes Bob, Bob, Bobbin' Along)" – 2:10
"Yardbird Suite" – 3:05

Side two
"Didee Bird" – 2:39
"Skylark" – 2:02
"Bye Bye Blackbird" – 3:11
"Blue Feather" – 2:53
"Bob White" – 2:13
"That's Owl, Brother" – 2:18

Personnel
Don Elliott, Granville Alexander "Sascha" Burland - vocalist
Hal McKusick - alto saxophone
Bobby Jaspar - flute
Sam Most - flute, tenor saxophone
Romeo Penque - flute, woodwinds
Sol Schlinger - baritone saxophone
Al Casamenti, Mundell Lowe - guitar
Trigger Alpert - double bass
James Campbell - drums, strings

References

1961 albums
The Nutty Squirrels albums
Columbia Records albums